Mai Amar Shahido ka Charan (Hindi: मैं अमर शहीदों का चारण; IAST: maiṃ amara śahīdoṃ kā cāraṇa) is a popular Hindi-language poem written by Srikrishna Saral (1919-2000). Saral calls himself 'Charan of the martyrs' as a parallel to the Charans of the medieval age who inspired soldiers in battles with the heroic deeds of the ancestors in poetic verses. The theme of the poem is that of remembering and cherishing the sacrifices of heroes who sacrificed their lives for the freedom of the country.

Refrain and example verse 
Every stanza in the poem end with a couplet carrying the same line: maim amara shahidom ka charana unake yasha gaya karata hum (I sing the praises of the immortal martyrs). Using a very simple language, Saral articulates India's revolutionaries, the freedom movement and patriotic ferver with his work and reminds the new generation of the country the virtue of the freedom struggle and the martyrs associated with it.

References

External links 

 श्रीकृष्ण सरल की रचनाएँ कविता कोश में
 साहित्यिक दधीचि श्रीकृष्ण 'सरल' थे 'अमर शहीदों का चारण'—सन्तोष व्यास

Indian poems
20th-century poems
Hindi poetry
Indian patriotic songs
Hindi-language literature